William Gerald Holmes (4 February 1952 – March 1988) was an English professional footballer who played in the Football League as a forward, most notably for Barnet and Hereford United.

Personal life 
After dropping out of professional football, Holmes worked as a warehouseman and in March 1988, he committed suicide at age 37.

Career statistics

Honours 
Wimbledon
Southern League Premier Division (2): 1975–76, 1976–77

References

1951 births
1988 suicides
Footballers from Balham
English footballers
Association football defenders
Woking F.C. players
Millwall F.C. players
Luton Town F.C. players
Barnet F.C. players
Wimbledon F.C. players
Hereford United F.C. players
Aylesbury United F.C. players
Brentford F.C. players
English Football League players
National League (English football) players
Suicides in England